Firefighter or fire fighter is a profession.

Firefighter or Fire Fighter(s) may also refer to:

Boats 

Fire Fighter (fireboat), a 1938 U.S. National Historic Landmark
Fire Fighter II, a 2010 NYFD fire boat
 Firefighter (Wilmington fireboat), built for Wilmington, Delaware, by MetalCraft Marine, in 2012
 Firefighter I (Singapore), see Fireboats in Singapore
 Firefighter II (Singapore), see Fireboats in Singapore

Arts, entertainment and media

Films 

Fire Fighters (film), a 1922 silent short film
The Fire Fighters (1927 film), a 1927 action film serial
The Fire Fighters (1930 film), a 1930 Mickey Mouse cartoon
Firefighter (film), a 1986 American made-for-television drama film

Literature 

Firefighter! Daigo of Fire Company M, a 1995 shōnen manga by Masahito Soda

Video games 

Fire Fighter (video game), a 1982 action game
Firefighter F.D.18, a 2004 action game

See also 
 List of firefighting museums
 
 
 
 
 Fireman (disambiguation)
 Firefight (disambiguation)